Gustave Boesman (19 January 1899 – 15 November 1971) was a Belgian footballer. He competed in the men's tournament at the 1928 Summer Olympics.

References

External links
 

1899 births
1971 deaths
Belgian footballers
Belgium international footballers
Olympic footballers of Belgium
Footballers at the 1928 Summer Olympics
Place of birth missing
Association football midfielders
K.A.A. Gent players